John Ross (born 6March 1967) is an Australian former rugby union footballer and coach.

Career 

Ross played for the Wallabies, the Brumbies, the ACT Kookaburras and the Australian A team.

He went to Scotland to coach the Peebles team. In 2006 he was coach of the Brumbies.

Credentials

Playing career 
 Royals (Canberra)
 ARFU President’s XV
 ACT Kookaburra
 ACT Brumbies
 Australia A
 Wallabies (toured but not capped)

Coaching career 

 Peebles, Scotland
 ACT Academy
 ACT brumbie Runners
 Australia U19
 Canberra Vikings ARC
 Easts Rugby Club Canberra

References

External links 
National teams

Australian rugby union coaches
Australian rugby union players
1967 births
Living people